The 1916 Washington and Lee Generals football team represented Washington and Lee University during the 1916 college football season. The Generals were coached by Jogger Elcock in his third year as head coach, compiling a record of 5–2–2 (1–0 SAIAA). The team gave John Heisman's Georgia Tech Yellow Jackets its only blemish with a 7–7 tie. It was captained by College Football Hall of Fame inductee Harry Young.

Tackle Bob Ignico was selected third-team All-American by Walter Camp.

Schedule

References

Washington And Lee
Washington and Lee Generals football seasons
Washington and Lee Generals Football